Zhishen may refer to:

Zhiduo (clothing), traditional Chinese attire (hanfu) for men
Lu Zhishen, fictional character in Water Margin